Cheshmehha (also Romanized as Cheshmehhā) is a village in Kuhestan Rural District, Jazmurian District, Rudbar-e Jonubi County, Kerman Province, Iran. At the 2006 census its population was 150, in 38 families.

References 

Populated places in Rudbar-e Jonubi County